Tripolis or Tripolis Larisaia, also called Scaea, was an ancient city in the Pelasgiotis in Thessaly, Greece, on the Peneus (Peneios) river, situated approximately 5 km to the east of Larissa.

During the Third Macedonian War, the Romans under Publius Licinius camped here on the march to Larissa (171 BCE).

Its site is tentatively located near Platykampos.

See also
List of Ancient Greek cities

References

 Richard Talbert, Barrington Atlas of the Greek and Roman World,, p. 55.

External links
Hazlitt, Classical Gazetteer, "Tripolis"

Cities in ancient Greece
Populated places in ancient Thessaly
Former populated places in Greece
Pelasgiotis